Renee Gonzalez (born 14 July 1998) is a Canadian rugby sevens player. She competed for Canada's sevens team at the 2022 Commonwealth Games in Birmingham. Her side lost to New Zealand in the bronze medal match to finish in fourth place.

References 

1998 births
Living people
Female rugby sevens players
Canada international women's rugby sevens players
20th-century Canadian women
21st-century Canadian women
Rugby sevens players at the 2022 Commonwealth Games